Martin Leyer-Pritzkow (born 2 January 1957 in Düsseldorf) is a German curator and writer about contemporary art. He lives and works in Düsseldorf, Germany.

Life 
Martin Leyer-Pritzkow grew up the first years in Düsseldorf. Influenced by his grandfather, who has taken him to many exhibitions of classical modernism as a child, his interest in art developed. At grammar school in Düsseldorf-Gerresheim he received art lessons from Konrad Fischer (artist name: Konrad Lueg) and Gerhard Richter. In the year 1972 Leyer-Pritzkow changed school and graduated for high school in Bonn.

After studying economics at the Universities of Regensburg and Cologne, he began his career in 1983 as a marketing manager at Diners Club International, in Germany. He was director of marketing and sales at a former subsidiary of the 1989 Swiss reinsurance and the "Dr. Harald Quandt Holding ". He subsequently worked as a managing partner of a Direct Marketing company in Munich and consultant for a French consulting company in Lyon. In 1996 he started his own business as an independent curator in Düsseldorf.

Curatorial activities 
Martin Leyer-Pritzkow organizes his own exhibitions of contemporary art in Germany and foreign countries. He cares about artistic life works, mediates contemporary fine art and gives lectures about the quality characteristics of contemporary art and strategical collecting. He analysis developments and tendencies of the international art market in newspapers and broadcast.

Curated exhibitions (selection) 
 2016 H50 21K, Domagk Art studios, Munich, Germany
 2015 Natura nutrix - Homo vorax, Collateralevent of the 56th Venice Biennale with Nevia Pizzul-Capello and Hans-Joachim Petersen at Palazzo Albrizzi, Associaczone Culturale Italo-Tedesca, Venice, Italy
 2010 Muc-Dus Exchange, White Box, Munich and E.ON Headquarters, Düsseldorf, Germany
 2001 Young Figuratives, 2001 Carolinen Palais Munich, Germany
 2002  Young Figuratives Mönchehaus-Museum of Modern Art, Goslar, Germany
 2000 Adolf Bierbrauer, NRW Forum, Düsseldorf, Germany
 2000  Young Figurattives Cologne, Germany
 1999  Young Figuratives Rovigo, Italy
 1998 Due Dimensioni – Arte Giovane Italia e Germania, Venice, Italy
 1998 Young German Painters, Decoplage, Miami, USA

Exhibited artists (selection) 
Agata Agatowski, Mahssa Askari, Armin Baumgarten, Thomas Bernstein, Christoph Beyer, Sarah Budde, Adolf Bierbrauer, Peter Brüning, Stefan Demary, Thea Djordjadze, Stefan Ettlinger, Fabrizio Gazzarri, Jårg Geismar, Karl Otto Götz, Heinz Hausmann, Hans-Jörg Holubitschka, Gerhard Hoehme, Florian Huth, Jacobo Jarach, Tina Juretzek, Agnieszka Kaszubowska, Horst Keining, Sven Kierst, Anna Krammig, Hendrik Krawen, Augusta Laar, André Lanskoy, Peter Lindenberg, Bernard Lokai, Yoshiyuki Miura, Maria-Elisabetta Novello, Jennifer Rieker, Katrin Roeber, Thomas Ruch, Julia Schewalie, Thyra Schmidt, Emil Schumacher, Brigitte Stenzel, Angelika J. Trojnarski, Fritz Winter et alii.

Teaching 
From 1999 to 2008 he was lecturer at the Accademia di Belle Arti di Venezia in Venice.

Writings 
(Ed.): Due Dinemsioni, Giovane Arte in Italia e Germania Texts by Massimo Dona, Fabrizio Gazzarri, Martin Leyer-Pritzkow, Tonato Antonio and Luigi Viola, in English, Italian and German language, Leyer-Pritzkow, Düsseldorf 1998, .
(Ed.). Adolf Bierbrauer, in English and German language, Leyer-Pritzkow, Düsseldorf 2000, .
(Ed.): Young Figuratives, in English and German language, Ketterer Kunst, Munich 2001. . 
(Ed.): Fabrizio Gazzarri: Dialoghi Inversi – Fabrizio Gazzarri, in English, Italian and German language, Leyer-Pritzkow, Düsseldorf 2003. .
with Klaus Sebastian: Das Kunstkaufbuch (The Art Purchase Book) Prestel, Munich, Berlin, London, New York, 2005. .
Limits of freedom, the aesthetics of the moment, the introduction to the photographs of the artist Sven Kierst, in English and German, dauvi-Verlag, Bergheim 2012, .

External links 
Website from curator of contemporary art Martin Leyer-Pritzkow
Wikipedia Germany
Literature by Martin Leyer-Pritzkow in the German National Library 
Literature by Martin Leyer-Pritzkow in the online Library "Bibliothèque Kadinsky", Centre Pompidou, France
Literature by Martin Leyer-Pritzkow in the online library of the fine art collection of North Rhine-Westfalia
 Picasso-Rekord-kuendet-von-der-Panik-der-Superreichen (Picasso record tells of panic of the super rich), Interview from Daniel Eckert with Martin Leyer-Pritzkow e.a., Die Welt – online, 13 May. 2015
 In zehn Jahren wird es das erste Milliarden Kunstwerk geben (In ten years there will be the first art work for a billion), Curator Leyer-Pritzkow: The boom just started, in: Die Welt, 16 February 2008
 Der Spiegel, Die Dekade der Gier (The Decade of Greed) Nr. 10 / 2005

Television 
 Television Interview with Munic TV about the curated exhibition H50 21K in Domagk Studios, Munic with Christopher Griebel (German Language), 2016 

1957 births
German art curators
Writers from Düsseldorf
Abstract expressionism
Living people